Sparoair was a family of air-launched sounding rockets developed by the United States Navy in the late 1950s and early 1960s. Based on the Sparrow air-to-air missile, three versions of the rocket were developed; although some launches were successful, the system did not enter operational service.

Sparoair I and II
Sparoair was developed by the Naval Missile Center, as a two-stage development of the Sparrow III air-to-air missile.

The Sparoair I was the original version of the rocket, launched using an ejection system and a lanyard for firing; after that proved unreliable in flight testing, the Sparoair II was developed that utilised a rail launch with ignition prior to release from the aircraft. Eight launches of Sparoair II vehicles had been conducted by 1961. Each Sparoair II rocket cost US$6,000.

Sparoair III
Sparoair III utilised a redesigned second-stage motor, and could be launched from the F-4 Phantom II; however, any aircraft capable of launching the Sparrow III AAM could launch the Sparoair.

The Sparoair III utilised the aircraft's Low Altitude Bombing System (LABS) circuits to initiate launch; the second stage was ignited via a mechanical device armed by the acceleration of the first stage.

The first Sparoair III was launched on 8 July 1965; it proved a partial failure as the second stage failed to ignite. The second launch on 26 May 1966 failed after six seconds of second-stage burn when the vehicle exploded. No further launches were undertaken.

References

Sounding rockets of the United States
Equipment of the United States Navy